Selva is a hamlet of the municipality of Grigno in the province of Trentino.

Road to Rifugio la Barricata 
From the small hamlet the road leads to the Marcesina plateau, the destination of many cycling and motorcyclist excursions. However, the road is often closed during the winter due to the heavy snowfall affecting the area.

References 

Frazioni of Trentino